Frederick II, Count Palatine of the Rhine (9 December 1482 – 26 February 1556), also Frederick the Wise, a member of the Wittelsbach dynasty, was Prince-elector of the Palatinate from 1544 to 1556.

The Kurfürst-Friedrich-Gymnasium in Heidelberg is named after him.

Early life 
Frederick was born at Winzingen Castle near Neustadt an der Weinstraße as the fourth son of Philip, Elector Palatine and Margarete of Bavaria-Landshut. He was the Duke Count Palatine and served as counselor and general for Charles V, Holy Roman Emperor, commanding expeditions against the Turks in 1529 and 1532, and assisting the Emperor at the Diet of Augsburg in 1530. In 1535, he married in Heidelberg to Dorothea of Denmark. In 1517, he had declared his love suit to the Habsburg Princess Eleanor of Austria, but this was discovered by her brother Charles V, then duke of Burgundy and king of Spain, resulting in Count Frederick being temporarily banished from court until he returned after announcing to Charles his Imperial election in 1519.

He was custodian of the young dukes of Palatinate-Neuburg Otto Henry and Philip and then served as general for the Habsburg Ferdinand I.

Pretender to the Norwegian throne 
Frederick was for a time involved in coup plans in Denmark-Norway. His wife Dorothea was a daughter of Christian II of Denmark, the former King of Denmark and Norway who was deposed after a Danish noble rebellion in 1523. The exiled Christian II was contacted by Olav Engelbrektsson, Catholic Archbishop of Norway and head of the Council of the Realm, in 1529, about retaking the throne of Norway from the Protestant friendly King Frederick I. Christian II was a Protestant, but was also the brother-in-law of Emperor Charles V and therefore vowed to help the Catholic cause in Norway. Christian II tried to retake Norway in 1531, but he was defeated in 1532. He was then imprisoned and was kept a prisoner for the next 27 years in Denmark. 

After Frederick's marriage to Dorothea in 1535, Frederick soon sent a letter to Olav Engelbrektsson (via emissaries in Brussels) telling him that he would claim the throne and he also promised military support from himself and Charles V. In the winter of 1536, Olav Engelbrektsson sent squads of supporters to villages in Eastern Norway; among other things the squads read the letter out to people, signalling that a new ruler could be on his way. However, few peasants joined the would-be rebellion, but other sources say that many farmers and bourgeoisie in Eastern Norway rose up in rebellion for the Archbishop, but it soon failed as no actual support from Frederick or Charles came. In the winter of 1537, then, Frederick did send two ships from the Habsburg Netherlands. However, this was to no avail as the King of Denmark mounted a naval offensive to secure Norway around the same time. Olav Engelbrektsson fled the country in April, bishops Hoskuld Hoskuldsson and Mogens Lauritssøn were arrested, in June, other supporters were punished and the Catholic Church in Norway and the Council of the Realm were abolished.

Frederick and his wife Dorothea never gave up on his claim to the throne of Norway (and also Denmark), and worked actively to have the Emperor Charles V to support it. In 1539, they visited the Emperor in Spain to press the matter, but without success.  In 1544, Frederick became Elector Palatine. The Emperor officially acknowledged Christian III as king of Denmark and Norway the same year, in the Treaty of Speyer, but Frederick continued to press his claim until his death.

Prince-elector of the Electoral Palatinate 
In March 1544, Frederick succeeded his brother Louis V as Prince-elector of the Palatinate. At Christmas of 1546 Frederick and his wife Dorothea took communion in the Protestant way in Heidelberg, which provoked Emperor Charles V displeasure. For a while, Frederick took the side of the Protestant opposition. However, he soon rejoined the Emperor's Catholic cause. After this, Frederick prevented the introduction of Protestant Reformation in the Palatinate. Frederick II died in February 1556 in Alzey, he was succeeded by his former ward Otto Henry.

Ancestors

References

External links 

Wittelsbach, Frederick II, Count Palatine of the Rhine
Wittelsbach, Frederick II, Count Palatine of the Rhine
House of Wittelsbach
Prince-electors of the Palatinate
Pretenders to the Norwegian throne
People from Neustadt an der Weinstraße
Burials at the Church of the Holy Spirit, Heidelberg